Independence Memorial Museum in Colombo, Sri Lanka is located in the basement of the Independence Memorial Hall, Independence Square (formally Torrington Square) in the Cinnamon Gardens. It is maintained by the Department of National Museum. The museum was established with the objective honouring national heroes who were instrumental in the country gaining independence from the British Rule. The Museum has a series of busts, display boards depicting the names, images and information of the political leaders, clergy and the lay patriots who were at the centre of the struggle for independence.

See also 
List of museums in Sri Lanka

References

External links 
 Image Gallery : Independence Memorial Museum

Legislative buildings in Sri Lanka
Monuments and memorials in Sri Lanka
Museums in Colombo
Museums established in 2008
2008 establishments in Sri Lanka
History museums in Sri Lanka